Independent Division of Chengdu Military Region was formed in August 1964 from Public Security Contingent of Sichuan province. The division was composed of four regiments (1st to 4th). (From May 1st 1955 to October 1969 Chengdu Military Region also acted as Sichuan Military Region.)

On January 22, 1968, the divisional commander, Du Ling(), was shot to death when he was travelling in his car in Chengdu, when he was trying to pass the barricade guarded by armed "rebels", and his deputy commander Li Wen() badly injured. (See Cultural Revolution for reference.)

In September 1969 the division was renamed as 1st Independent Division of Chengdu Military Region. 

In February 1970 the division was renamed as 1st Independent Division of Sichuan Provincial Military District. 

The division was disbanded in May 1976.

References
中国各省军区独立师的历史沿革, https://web.archive.org/web/20160918225002/http://www.360doc.com/content/13/1205/20/1164894_334784330.shtml

IC
Military units and formations established in 1966
Military units and formations disestablished in 1976